Andheri (station code: A (Western)/AD (Harbour)/ADH (Indian Railways)) is a passenger rail station located at Andheri suburb of Mumbai. It serves the Western line and Harbour lines of the Mumbai Suburban Railway. It is also a stop for some express trains and August Kranti Rajdhani Express. The station also inter-connects the Line 1 of the Andheri metro station. Andheri station first came under prominence after the development of Salsette–Trombay Railway services in 1928 by the British Empire of India during the pre-independence period.

With a pre-eminent number of passengers boarding daily, it has been termed "one of the busiest stations" in Mumbai surpassing Ghatkopar station on the Central line. In addition, the station has two bus stations operating more than 30 bus routes.

History

Salsette–Trombay railway service 
The Indian Railways was first established by British Empire of India in 1853 and it connected its first railway service between Bombay (now Mumbai) and Thane. In 1928, the British Empire connected Andheri station with Trombay by the Great Indian Peninsular Railway under the Bombay Improvement Trust as "Salsette–Trombay Railway line" with a view for the opening up of a railway line running West to South-east and linking up Andheri and Kurla station. However, in 1934 the line had shut down due to the development of Santacruz Airport.

Metro–Local connection 
In February 2014, It was proposed by the Mumbai Metropolitan Region Development Authority to integrate the Andheri metro station with the suburban station with the development of the skywalk and the same was proposed for the Ghatkopar metro station.

After the establishment of Mumbai Metro services In June 2014, a skywalk of  has been developed by the MMRDA for the passengers traveling from local station to the metro station.

Proposed expansion and re-development 
The Harbour line of the Andheri station towards Chhatrapati Shivaji Terminus and  serves a total number of 55 trains per day, with 46 running to Chhatrapati Shivaji Maharaj Terminus and only 9 towards Panvel. The extension between Andheri and Goregaon of the Harbour Line was completed and had started to operate in 2018.

The station was renovated in early 2015 with the establishment of automated escalators and new Automated Ticket Vending Machines (ATVM) for the ease of booking tickets to the daily passengers. According to the statistics of April 2014 to January 2015, the number of passengers using vending machines was 6,933, whereas in April 2015 to January 2016, it had the higher number of bookings with a total number of 18,316 passengers.
Due to the increasing number of passengers travelling on the rooftop of the train coaches, Commissioner of Railway Safety (CRS) electrified the train coaches rooftops containing 25,000 volts.

The station has nine platforms, with platform number 1 and 2 serving the Harbour line. Further, the Harbour lines now serves a 12-coach train services.  In 2012, it was proposed by the Mumbai Railway Vikas Corporation that the Harbour line trains may get an extension of 12-coaches for the ease of passengers boarding daily from the Western lines. However the MRVC announced that extension of some stations has been completed and the services may start from 2016.

In February 2016, it was reported that the main road of the eastern zone of the station will be re-constructed in according for development of a long delayed elevated auto-rickshaw terminal. The Bombay High Court had ordered to evict the stalls blocking the road. Counsel Anil Sakhare had stated to the court that the stall vendors blocked the construction and infrastructure development and most of the vendors opposed the eviction notice given to them. The work was originally started in 2011 and was to complete in December 2013 but as the corporation was unable to evict the stalls, the work was kept on hold. However, the Brihanmumbai Municipal Corporation had removed the stalls from the road and the construction for the terminal had been started. Under the second phase of MUTP, three escalators and 2 lifts will be installed.

Platforms

Traffic 
Andheri is the busiest station on the Western Railway network. Over 99.6 million passengers' journeys originated at the station during the 2016–17 fiscal year. An average of 66,152 tickets and 2,441 season passes were sold at the station daily, and an average of 256,561 passengers began their journeys at Andheri per day contributing  of average daily revenue.

Station layout 

The station consists of a -long auto-rickshaw terminal at the eastern zone of Andheri. It has been built between the northern and middle foot-over bridges of the station and its connected to the northern bridge and continues down a road to the MV Road. In addition, the auto-rickshaw services are used for the passengers crossing through the Nityanand Road from the northern bridge to get down the road at the eastern bridge of the station. However, the designed structure was used for commuters serving as the only foot overbridge for the metro station as the terminal was kept unused.

Bus connections 

The Oshiwara depot serves as a major hub and transfer point for Andheri bus routes serving the western area. All routes pull into the station's busway off Yari Road bus station, though some can be caught at Goregaon via the station's bus depot entrance as well. The eastern area is connected by buses between Agarkar Chowk Depot and Majas Depot, Ghatkopar Depot, Kurla Depot and Mulund Depot. But due to the increment of the Mumbai Metro service fare rates, the Ghatkopar-Andheri bus services proved to be a beneficial deal for the passengers.

References

External links 

Andheri railway station at WR official portal
Andheri station at Go4Mumbai

Railway stations in Mumbai Suburban district
Mumbai Suburban Railway stations
Mumbai WR railway division
Railway stations opened in 1928
1928 establishments in India
Andheri